A permanent magnet  motor is a type of  electric motor that uses permanent magnets in addition to windings on its field, rather than windings only.

Applications

Electric vehicles 

This type of motor is used in GM's Chevrolet Bolt and Volt, and the rear wheel drive of Tesla's Model 3. Recent dual motor Tesla models use a combination of a permanent magnet motor at the back and traditional induction motor at the front.

Permanent magnet motors are more efficient than induction motor or motors with field windings for certain high-efficiency applications such as electric vehicles. Tesla's chief motor designer was quoted discussing these advantages, saying:

Types 
Permanent magnet motors consist of two main types. Surface permanent magnet motors (SPM) and internal permanent magnet (IPM) motors. The main difference is that SPM motors place the magnets on the outside of the rotor while IPM motors place their magnets inside the motor. Benefits to internal magnets include structural integrity and reducing Back EMF. Since holes must be cut into the rotor for the placement of the magnets this creates areas of high reluctance allowing carmakers to some of the benefits of reluctance motors as well as permanent magnet motors.

Back electromotive force 
Back electromotive force (EMF) is also known as the counter-electromotive force. It is the voltage that occurs in electric motors from the relative motion between the stator windings and the rotor’s magnetic field. The rotor's geometry determines the waveform's shape.

This effect is not unique to permanent magnet motors. Induction motors also suffer from it. However in an induction motor the fields from the rotor decrease as speed increases. A permanent magnet motor generates its own constant field. This means that as speed increases a voltage is induced linearly with the speed on the stator. This voltage is negative to the voltage provided to the motor and thus is a loss to the overall system.

Environmental and supply concerns
Permanent magnet motors utilize several types of permanent magnet materials, including hard ferrites, alnico, samarium cobalt and neodymium iron boron.  Hard ferrites are the permanent magnet material most commonly found (by weight) in permanent magnet motors.  This is due to their low cost.  If other factors are important (size, temperature capability, calibration, coercivity, etc.), motor design engineers typically use one of the other permanent magnet materials.

Rare earth production has the consequence of generating waste with elevated radioactivity compared to the natural radioactivity of the ores (waste that is referred to by the US EPA as TENORM, or Technologically Enhanced Naturally Occurring Radioactive Materials).  China, the top producer of neodymium, restricted shipments to Japan in 2010 during a controversy over disputed ownership of islands. China imposed strict export quotas on several rare earth metals, saying it wanted to control pollution and preserve resources. The quotas were lifted in 2015. Although neodymium is relatively abundant, global demand for neodymium outstripped production by about 10% in 2017.

See also
Synchronous motor § Permanent-magnet motors
Induction motor

References

External links
 

Electric motors